The 2013 Bosnia and Herzegovina Football Cup Final was the 18th final of the Bosnia and Herzegovina Football Cup, the highest football cup competition in Bosnia.

The date of both 2013 Final matches, as in all the recent years, was set so that it avoids clashes with Premier League of Bosnia and Herzegovina fixtures. Both matches took place on Tuesday, between two rounds of the Premier League of Bosnia and Herzegovina.

The current holders, Željezničar were not able to defend their title with Široki Brijeg bringing a trophy home after six years of drought after they won 5–4 on penalties (both legs finished 1–1).

Route to the Final

Note: In all results below, the score of the finalist is given first.

Pre-match
This final marked the ninth appearance in final of Bosnia and Herzegovina Football Cup for Željezničar and tenth final in domestic cups, since they were once in final of Yugoslav Cup. They had won the cup five times (in 2000, 2001, 2003, 2011 and 2012) and have been beaten in 4 occasions (in 1981, 1997, 2002 and 2010). On the other side, this was the fifth final for Široki Brijeg and they won it once (in 2007), with three finals lost (in 2005, 2006 and 2012). This was the second consecutive time these two clubs met each other in the final of this competition, while it was the sixth overall encounter in this competition (they met each other before once in final, three times in semi-finals and once in quarter-finals).

On 9 April 2013, a draw to decide who will be the first host was held with Željezničar hosting the first leg on 30 April at 18:00 CEST and Široki Brijeg the rematch two weeks later on 14 May at 19:00 CEST, with both matches aired on BHT1. Unlike the two last finals, in which Željezničar also played, this time the ticket price wasn't raised but rather remained the same as the prices for the regular tickets for the league matches, which were €2.50 for the south stand (the stand were The Maniacs are), €4 for the north stand and €5 for the west stand.

The kick-off for the second leg was set at 19:00 CEST, on Tuesday, 14 May. Before the match, Željezničar was in a more-than-four-year unbeaten streak in national cup, with the last lost match dating to 24 September 2008 against Zvijezda in the first round of the 2008–09 Bosnia and Herzegovina Football Cup. Since then, they have played 35 matches in the national cup, winning in 22 of those matches and drawing 13, with a goal difference of 61 to 10. They won three of the last four national cups, since they lost the final in 2009–10 Bosnia and Herzegovina Football Cup to Borac on an aggregate score of 3:3 after two draw matches. Borac won the cup because of more scored away goals.

Matches

Report for the first leg

Details for the first leg

Statistics for first leg

Report for the second leg

Details for the second leg

Statistics for second leg

See also
2012–13 Bosnia and Herzegovina Football Cup
2012–13 Premier League of Bosnia and Herzegovina
2012 Bosnia and Herzegovina Football Cup Final
Football Federation of Bosnia and Herzegovina

References

External links
Official site for the Football Federation of Bosnia and Herzegovina
Official site for the Football Federation of the Federation of Bosnia and Herzegovina
Official site for the Football Federation of the Republika of Srpska

Bosnia and Herzegovina Football Cup Finals
Final
Association football penalty shoot-outs